Marchers of Valhalla is a collection of two Fantasy novelettes by Robert E. Howard.  It was first published in 1972 by Donald M. Grant, Publisher, Inc. in an edition of 1,654 copies.  Grant published another collection of this title in 1977 .  This 1977 edition added one story and included dust-jacket and illustrations by Marcus Boas.

Contents

1972 book
 Introduction
 "Marchers of Valhalla"
 "The Thunder–Rider"

1977 book
 "Marchers of Valhalla"
 "The Grey God Passes"
 "The Thunder–Rider"

References

1972 short story collections
Short story collections by Robert E. Howard
Donald M. Grant, Publisher books
Fantasy short story collections